Transsion Holdings is a Chinese manufacturer of mobile phones based in Shenzhen. It was the largest smartphone manufacturer by sales in Africa in 2017, and also sells mobile phones in the Middle East, Southeast Asia, South Asia, and Latin America. Its brands include phone brands such as Itel, Tecno, Infinix; after-sales service brand Carlcare; and accessories brand Oraimo. It manufactures phones in China, Pakistan, Ethiopia, Bangladesh and recently in India.

History 
Transsion Holdings Pvt Ltd was founded as Transsion Technology in Hong Kong in 2006, with a focus on the development, manufacturing, sales, and services of mobile communication products. Transsion entered the African market with its Tecno and Itel brands, and started focusing on the African market in July 2008, initially with feature phones. Transsion released its first smartphone in 2014.

Transsion set up its Nigerian subsidiary in June 2008, and had subsidiaries in seven countries in Africa by October that year. Transsion set up a manufacturing plant in Ethiopia in 2011. Transsion entered the Indian market in 2016. The market share of Transsion's smartphone brands in Africa combined surpassed that of Samsung in 2017, making Transsion the largest manufacturer of smartphones for the African market in the fourth quarter of 2017. Transsion was also the largest manufacturer of mobile phones in Africa in the first half of 2017. Transsion's 2018 attempt at a reverse takeover failed.
In October 2018, Transsion Holdings started producing smartphones in their new manufacturing plant in Bangladesh. Transsion Holdings became a public listed company in September 2019 by listing on the STAR Market section of the Shanghai Stock Exchange.

Operations 
Transsion sells mobile phones in Africa, Middle East, Southeast Asia, South Asia, and Latin America. It operates mobile phone brands Tecno, Itel, and Infinix, as well as after-sales support service Carlcare and accessories brand Oraimo. Spice Digital, an Indian phone brand, was acquired in 2017. Transsion manufactures its phones in China, Ethiopia, Bangladesh, India, Pakistan. Transsion was the first non-African mobile phone company to set up an after-sales support network in Africa.

Transsion's success in the African market has been attributed to tailoring its phones' features to the needs of the African market. Transsion's phones offer a feature that calibrates camera exposures for darker skin tones, allowing face details to be retained. Transsion developed phones with dual SIM functionality, which were well received because African users commonly used more than one SIM card at a time to save money. Transsion released phones with long battery life, which are suited to low electrification rates in Africa and the propensity of blackouts. The phones included support for multiple African languages, and Tecno was the first major mobile phone brand in Ethiopia to include support for an Amharic keyboard. Transsion heavily advertises its mobile phone brands in Africa.

Apart from its successes in the African market, Transsion is among the fastest growing smartphone brands in India, with a YoY growth of 40% in 2019. It was also the number one brand in the entry-level smartphone market. Transsion's mobile phones are mostly entry-level to lower middle-range, and therefore not being intended for business clients.

References

External links

Holding companies of China
Manufacturing companies based in Shenzhen
Mobile phone companies of China
Mobile phone manufacturers